Armand V. Cucciniello III (born December 7, 1979) is a former American diplomat, news reporter and military advisor. Cucciniello was formerly spokesman for the U.S. Embassy in Iraq.

Education
Cucciniello is a graduate of Boston University, where he earned a Bachelor of Arts degree in 2002. He later earned an M.A. from Syracuse University's Maxwell School of Citizenship and Public Affairs.

Career
In 2006, Cucciniello moved to Baghdad, Iraq to work for Multi-National Force-Iraq (MNF-I).  Shortly after, he was hired by the U.S. Department of State to work in the Public Affairs Section at the U.S. embassy, located in the former Republican Palace (Arabic: القصر الجمهوري al-Qaṣr al-Ǧumhūriy) of Saddam Hussein.  As such, Cucciniello was made a non-career U.S. diplomat, and became a spokesperson for the U.S. embassy until 2010.  He subsequently served in Islamabad, Pakistan, and later worked for the United Nations Command, Combined Forces Command and United States Forces Korea in South Korea.

Writing 
In a 2016 article for USA Today, Cucciniello was the first to describe then-U.S. presidential candidate Donald J. Trump's foreign policy as "America First," a moniker subsequently used by New York Times reporters David E. Sanger and Maggie Haberman in their interview with Trump who, "agreed with a suggestion that his ideas might be summed up as 'America First'.  The phrase became a cornerstone of Trump's campaign platform, and later that of the Trump Administration. After Rex Tillerson was announced as Trump's nominee for United States Secretary of State, Cucciniello argued that Tillerson could perform well in the role given his depth of business experience.

References 

Living people
1979 births
Boston University alumni
Syracuse University alumni
Maxwell School of Citizenship and Public Affairs alumni
American diplomats